School Daze is a 1988 film by Spike Lee.

School Daze may also refer to:

 School Daze (soundtrack), a soundtrack album from the film
 "School Daze" (Garfield and Friends), a television episode
 "School Daze" (Law & Order), a television episode
 "School Daze", a song by W.A.S.P. from W.A.S.P., 1984

See also
 Skool Daze, a 1980s ZX Spectrum and later Commodore 64 video game
 My School Daze, a Singaporean TV series
 School Days (disambiguation)